Enos Eastman was a member of the Wisconsin State Assembly and the Wisconsin State Senate.

Biography
Eastman was born on October 27, 1821 in Ellisburg, New York. On January 11, 1844, he married Miriam Carpenter. Eastman died in June 1908.

His brother, La Fayette Eastman, was also a member of the Wisconsin State Assembly.

Career
Eastman was elected to the Assembly in 1870 and to the Senate in 1874. He was a Democrat.

References

See also

People from Ellisburg, New York
Democratic Party Wisconsin state senators
Democratic Party members of the Wisconsin State Assembly
1821 births
1908 deaths
Burials in Wisconsin
19th-century American politicians